Robin egg blue, also called eggshell blue, is a shade of cyan (bluish-green color), approximating the shade of the eggs laid by the American robin.

The first recorded use of robin egg blue as a color name in English was in 1873.

Variations

Tiffany Blue

Tiffany Blue is the trademarked name for the light medium tone of robin egg blue associated with Tiffany & Co., the New York City jewelry company.

Cultural associations
 In the United States, robin egg blue is often used as a haint blue for painting the ceilings of exterior porches, especially in the South.

See also
Eggshell (color)

References

Shades of cyan